Ruby Lee may refer to:

People
Ruby B. Lee, electrical engineer at Princeton University
Ruby Lee Stephens (1924–1996), baseball pitcher

Music
"Ruby Lee", a bonus track on the CD re-release of the 1956 B.B. King blues album Singin' the Blues
"Ruby Lee", a track on the 1974 Bill Withers soul/funk album +'Justments
"Ruby Lee", a track on the 1982 Joe Cocker album Sheffield Steel, the 1995 compilation The Long Voyage Home and the 2003 album The Ultimate Collection 1968–2003 (live version)

Botany
Vriesea 'Ruby Lee', a cultivar of the Vriesea ensiformis or Vriesea erythrodactylon bromeliads
Nidularium 'Ruby Lee', a cultivar of the Nidularium innocentii var. lineatum bromeliads

Other
Ruby Lee Mill Site in Joshua Tree National Park
Ruby Lee Gissing, the title character of the 1993 film Ruby in Paradise
Ruby Lee, a German show jumping horse in the 2010 FEI Nations Cup Promotional League